Gore Creek, an urban watercourse that is part of the Parramatta River catchment, is located in Northern Suburbs region of Sydney, Australia.

Course and features
Gore Creek rises in the suburb of Lane Cove on the western side of the Pacific Highway, south of Epping Road and the Lane Cove Tunnel, and east of Burns Bray Road; near the Lane Cove shopping village. The creek flows generally south then south-east, through the Lane Cove Bushland Park and Gore Creek Reserve before reaching its confluence with the Lane Cove River south of Greenwich Hospital.

Gore Creek draws its name from the suburb of Gore Hill, named in honour of William Gore, the provost-marshal under Governor William Bligh.

See also 

 Rivers of New South Wales

References 

Creeks and canals of Sydney
Parramatta River
Lane Cove Council